Avril Fahey (born 24 June 1974 in Subiaco, Western Australia) is a former Australian cricket player.

Fahey first played for the Western Australian women's cricket team in the 1992–93 cricket season. She played for Western Australia between 1992 and 2012. She played 164 domestic limited overs matches including 
124 Women's National Cricket League matches and 32 Women's Twenty20 games for the Western Fury.

Fahey played six Tests and 40 One Day Internationals for the Australia national women's cricket team.

Fahey retired from cricket in 2012. She captained the Western Fury in 45 matches and was the first woman to play 150 matches for Western Australia.

References

External links
 Avril Fahey at southernstars.org.au

Living people
1974 births
Australia women Test cricketers
Australia women One Day International cricketers
Western Australia women cricketers